is an original Japanese anime television series animated by Lerche. It aired from October to December 2021. A manga adaptation with art by Left Hand has been serialized online via Kadokawa Shoten's Comic Newtype manga website from October 2021, and a web novel by Ukyō Kodachi titled  began serialization on Kakuyomu in December 2021.

Characters

Media

Anime
The 12-episode original anime project was revealed on April 2, 2021. It is produced by Lerche and is directed by Masaomi Andō and written by Makoto Uezu. Original character designs are provided by Akio Watanabe, while Keiko Kurosawa adapts the designs for animation. Larx Entertainment is producing the 3DCG animation, with Daisuke Katō serving as the CG director. Egg Firm is producing the series. The series aired from October 11 to December 27, 2021, on AT-X, Tokyo MX, ytv, and BS11. Mia Regina performed the opening theme song "Fever Dreamer", while Aina Suzuki performed the ending theme song "Reverse-Rebirth". Funimation licensed the series outside of Asia. Muse Communication licensed the series in South and Southeast Asia.

On December 5, 2021, Funimation announced that the series would receive an English dub, which premiered the following day.

Episode list

Manga
A manga adaptation with art by Left Hand began serialization online via Kadokawa Shoten's Comic Newtype manga website on October 12, 2021.  It has been collected in a single tankōbon volume.

Notes

References

External links
Anime official website 

Anime with original screenplays
Crunchyroll anime
Japanese webcomics
Kadokawa Shoten manga
Lerche (studio)
Muse Communication
Seinen manga
Television shows written by Makoto Uezu